Rear Admiral David Kenneth Bawtree, CB DL BSc (Eng) CEng FIEE FIMechE (born 1 October 1937) was Civil Emergencies Adviser to the Home Office 1993–1997. He moved on to become the Chairman of Portsmouth Hospitals NHS Trust.

Bawtree joined the Royal Navy. He was promoted to captain on 31 December 1980. As a Weapon Engineering Officer, he was Director Naval Engineering Training 1987–1990, and Flag Officer and Naval Base Commander Portsmouth 1990–1993. He retired from the navy on 20 November 1993. After retirement he was Technical Director of Visor Consultants Limited.

He was appointed a Deputy lieutenant (DL) for Hampshire on 15 January 1997.

References

1937 births
Living people
Companions of the Order of the Bath
Royal Navy rear admirals
Deputy Lieutenants of Hampshire